Katherine Bryan (born 1982) is a British flautist. She was appointed Principal Flute of the Royal Scottish National Orchestra in Spring 2003, at the age of 21.

Career
Born in 1982, Bryan was educated at Chetham's School of Music in Manchester. Whilst there, in 1997 she won the Audi Young Musician competition, the only wind player ever to do so, after performing the Nielsen concerto with the Orchestra of the Academy of St Martin in the Fields conducted by Daniel Harding. The performance was broadcast live on Classic FM. She was a woodwind finalist in the BBC TV Young Musicians competition in 1998, 2000 and 2002, and a prizewinner in the 1999 Royal Overseas League Competition. Later that year she won the Royal Philharmonic Society's Julius Isserlis Scholarship, which enabled her to study at Juilliard School in New York from 2000 until graduation in 2003. Bryan was featured in The Times as a Great British Hope - a Rising Star in the Arts Firmament.

In 2001, Bryan gave her Lincoln Center debut playing Mozart's Flute concerto in G major with the Juilliard Symphony Orchestra after winning the Juilliard concerto competition. She has performed with the New York Philharmonic Orchestra, the Nuremberg Symphony Orchestra, and spent the summers of 2001 and 2002 with the Pacific Music Festival Orchestra in Japan. Bryan performed Mozart's Flute and harp concerto with the harpist Pippa Tunnell in the 2004 RSNO Scottish Power Proms, and in July 2004, she gave a solo flute recital at the Cheltenham International Festival.

She continues to perform regularly around the UK and abroad. In addition to her position with the RSNO, Bryan has performed as Guest Principal Flute with orchestras including the Halle, the Scottish Chamber Orchestra, the Northern Sinfonia, Royal Philharmonic Orchestra, London Philharmonic Orchestra and the London Symphony Orchestra.

Bryan is also a lecturer of flute at the Royal Scottish Academy of Music and Drama, and runs her own course, Scottish Masterclasses.

In September 2015, Bryan released an album, Silver Bow, accompanied by the Royal Scottish National Orchestra conducted by Jac van Steen.

Katherine joined management agency Ikon Arts Management in March 2016.

References

1982 births
Living people
English flautists
Women flautists
21st-century English women musicians
21st-century flautists